Nabi Chit Stadium is a 5,000 capacity multi-purpose stadium in Al-Nabi Shayth, Lebanon. It is currently used mostly for football matches.

References 

Football venues in Lebanon
Multi-purpose stadiums in Lebanon